is a Japanese architect. In 1994, he and his wife Yui Tezuka founded the Tokyo-based firm Tezuka Architects. Projects by Tezuka Architects include the Roof House,  Echigo-Matsunoyama Museum of Natural Science, Fuji Kindergarten and Woods of Net. Their recent awards include Japan Institute of Architects Prize (2009), Association for Children's Environment Design Award (2011), OECD/CELE 4th Compendium of Exemplary Educational Facilities (2011) and a Global Award for Sustainable Architecture (2017).

Career
Born in Tokyo, Japan in 1964,  Takaharu Tezuka studied architecture at Musashi Institute of Technology and at the University of Pennsylvania. He then went to London where spent four years with the Richard Rogers Partnership. 
In 1994, together with his wife, Yui Tezuka, he established Tezuka Architects in Tokyo. The couple's work emphasizes human activity and connectivity as can be seen in their schools, office buildings and hospitals.

Brief career history 
1964	     Born in Tokyo	
1987	     B.Arch., Musashi Institute of Technology	
1990	     M.Arch., University of Pennsylvania	
1990–1994   Richard Rogers Partnership Ltd.	
1994            Established, Tezuka Architects	
1996–2003   Assistant Professor, Musashi Institute of Technology	
2005, 06	    Visiting Professor, Salzburg Summer Academy	
2006	    Visiting Professor, University of California, Berkeley	
2009–	    Professor, Tokyo City University

Main works 
1996 – Soejima Hospital 
1999 – Wood Deck House
2000 – Megaphone House
2000 – Kawagoe Music Apartment 
2001 – Roof House
2001 – Balcony House
2001 – Wall-less House
2002 – Saw Roof House
2003 – Matsunoyama Natural Science Museum　
2003 – Engawa House
2003 – TOYOTA L&F HIROSHIMA
2003 – House to catch the sky III
2005 – Visionary Arts, Tokyo
2005 – Floating Roof House  
2006 – Eaves House 
2006 – Sandou house	　
2006 – Observatory Room House 　　　　　　　
2006 – My Own Sky House 
2007 – Cloister House
2007 – Fuji Kindergarten
2007 -House to Catch the Sunlight
2007 – Kanjoin Kannondo
2007 – Kumejima Eef Beach Hotel　
2007 – House to Catch the Hill 
2007 – Wilful Townhouse
2007 – House to Catch the Sea           
2007 – GRV     
2007 – Temple to catch the forest         
2009 – Woods of Net
2009 – Pitched Roof House               
2009 – Drawer House 
2009 – Umbrella House
2010 – House of Ship
2010 – Snail House 
2011 – Step House in a Shopping Street 
2011 – Ring Around a Tree
2011 – OG Giken Tokyo branch
2012 – OG Giken Kyushu branch
2012 – House to Catch the Mountain 
2012 – Deck House 
2012 – Asahi Kindergarten 
2012 – Yamamotochou Fuji Kindergarten
2013 – Child Chemo House
2013 – Chigasaki Zion Christian Church/Mihato Kindergarten

Fuji Kindergarten
Fuji Kindergarten in Japan, designed by architect Takaharu Tezuka, emphasizing the idea that children do not need to be forced to learn but they naturally cannot stop. The kindergarten is an open-air kindergarten, designed to encourage and facilitate social interaction between students as well as discovery-style learning. Students are encouraged to design their own learning environment through the use of crates to separate classrooms, trees are left to grow within the structure of the kindergarten that students are able to climb, and additional structures within the kindergarten allow for exploration for students to delve into and discover in a collaborative manner.

Exhibitions
Japan-Poland: New Architecture / 1994–2004 
Venice Biennale / 2004
Aichi expo, Japan /2005
Gallery Ma, Japan / 2006
London Biennale /2006
Inax Gallery, Tokyo /2007    
Deutsches Architektur Museum Exhibition, Frankfurt /2009  
Contemplating The Void: Interventions In The Guggenneim Museum, New York/ 2010
JapanLisztRaiding, Austria/2010
Carnegie International 2013 ｛｛ http://ci13.cmoa.org/artists/tezuka-architects ｝｝

Awards
1997 – Ministry of International Trade and Industry, Good Design Gold Prize (Soejima Hospital)	
1998 – Architectural Institution of Japan, Annual Architectural Commendations (Soejima Hospital)	
2002 – Japan Institute of Architects Prize (Roof House) Yoshioka Prize
2002 – Yoshioka Foundation (Roof House)	
2003 – Architectural Institution of Japan, Annual Architectural Commendations (Roof House)
2003 – Good Design Prize, Japan Industrial Design Organization, (Styrene foam sofa)	
2004 – Good Design Prize, Japan Industrial Design Organization (Hounancho "L" Condominium)
2004 – Ecobuild Award, Ecobuild Japan (Echigo-matsunoyama Museum of Natural Science)
2004 – the Architectural Review (Echigo-matsunoyama Museum of Natural Science)
2005 – Architectural Institution of Japan, Annual Architectural Commendations (Matsunoyama Natural Science Museum)	
2007 – Ministry of Economy, Trade and Industry, Interaction Design Prize (Fuji Kindergarten)
2007 – Ministry of Economy, Trade and Industry, Kids Design Gold Prize (Fuji Kindergarten)
2007 – Association for Children's Environment, ACE Award Design Category (Fuji Kindergarten)
2007 – Design for Asia Grand Award (Fuji Kindergarten)
2007 – Highly Commended, the Architectural Review (Fuji Kindergarten)	
2008 – Architectural Institution of Japan Prize (Fuji Kindergarten)
2009 – The Japan Institute of Architects Prize, the Japan Institute of Architects (Fuji Kindergarten)
2009 – The Architecture Award, Asia Pacific Property Awards 2009 (Fuji Kindergarten)	
2011 – Association for Children's Environment Design Award (Woods of Net)
2011 – The Best of All, OECD/CELE 4th Compendium of Exemplary Educational Facilities (Fuji Kindergarten)
2011 – Good Design Prize, Japan Industrial Design Organization (OG Giken Tokyo Branch)
2013 – Association for Children's Environment Design Award (Asahi Kindergarten)
2013 – Architectural Institution of Japan, Annual Architectural Commendations (Ring Around a Tree)
2013 – Good Design Gold Award, Japan Industrial Design Organization (Asahi Kindergarten)
2013 – Good Design Prize, Japan Industrial Design Organization (OG Giken Kyushu branch)
2017 – Global Award for Sustainable Architecture

Publication
Tezuka, Takaharu, and Yui Tezuka. Takaharu + Yui Tezuka Architecture Catalogue. Tokyo: TOTO Publishing, 2006.
Tezuka, Takaharu, and Yui Tezuka. Takaharu + Yui Tezuka Architecture Catalogue 2. Tokyo: TOTO Publishing, 2009.
Tezuka, Takaharu, and Yui Tezuka. Takaharu + Yui Tezuka Architecture Catalogue 3. Tokyo: TOTO Publishing, 2015.
Tezuka, Takaharu, and Yui Tezuka. Takaharu + Yui Tezuka NOSTALGIC FUTURE ERINNERTE ZUKUNFT.  Edited by Paul Andreas and Peter Cachola Schmal. JOVIS Verlag Berlin 2009 
Tezuka, Takaharu, and Yui Tezuka. ROOFLESS ARCHITECTURE / Summer Academy Salzburg. Edited by Miyako Nairz. Salzburg: Huttegger, 2008.
Tezuka, Takaharu, and Yui Tezuka. FLOORLESS ARCHITECTURE / Summer Academy Salzburg. Edited by Miyako Nairz. Salzburg: Huttegger, 2008.
Tezuka Architects  – The Yellow Book, JOVIS Verlag Berlin 2016,

References

External links 
Tezuka Architects – official website
Fuji Kindergarten, with illustrations, from Architonic
Takaharu Tezuka: The best kindergarten you've ever seen at TED

1964 births
Living people
Japanese architects
People from Tokyo
University of Pennsylvania School of Design alumni